Valerijus Mižigurskis (born 22 April 1983) is a Lithuanian professional football player. As of March 2011, he plays for FC Levadia Tallinn.

External links
 

1983 births
Living people
Lithuanian footballers
Lithuanian people of Russian descent
Lithuania international footballers
Lithuanian expatriate footballers
Expatriate footballers in Russia
Lithuanian expatriate sportspeople in Latvia
Expatriate footballers in Latvia
Expatriate footballers in Kazakhstan
FK Žalgiris players
FK Ekranas players
Lithuanian expatriate sportspeople in Kazakhstan
FC Spartak Moscow players
Association football forwards
FC Dynamo Makhachkala players